Port-de-Paix Airport  is in passenger numbers, the third airport in Haiti and is located in the city with the same name, Port-de-Paix, on the north coast of Haiti.

The airport does not have radar, nor is it a radio controlled aerodrome. The air traffic control center functions without these. The runway is within the city and is subject to pedestrian traffic. The Port de Paix non-directional beacon (Ident: PPX) is located near the runway.

Airlines and destinations
As of July 2017 there are no scheduled services to Port-de-Paix.

See also
Transport in Haiti
List of airports in Haiti

References

External links
OpenStreetMap - Port-de-Paix
Landings.com - Port-de-Paix
OurAirports - Port-de-Paix Airport

Airports in Haiti